The Swedenhielm Family (Danish: Familien Swedenhielm) is a 1947 Danish comedy film directed by Lau Lauritzen and starring Poul Reumert, Ebbe Rode and Beatrice Bonnesen. It was shot at the ASA Film Studios at Lyngby in Copenhagen. It is based on the 1925 play Swedenhielms by Hjalmar Bergman, previously adapted into a 1935 Swedish film Swedenhielms directed by Gustaf Molander

Cast
 Poul Reumert as 	Rolf Swedenhielm sr.
 Ebbe Rode as 	Rolf Swedenhielm jr.
 Beatrice Bonnesen as 	Julia Kørner
 Kjeld Arrild as 	Mand i lufthavn
 Mogens Brandt as 	Disponent
 Per Buckhøj as 	Instruktør
 Poul Bundgaard as 	Mand i lufthavn
 Hulda Didrichsen as 	Påklæderske
 Ejner Federspiel as 	Nielsen
 Maria Garland as Martha Boman
 Alfred Hansen as 	Gammel mand
 Kjeld Jacobsen as 	Togpassager
 Else Jarlbak as 	Gustava
 Preben Kaas as 	Kontorassistent
 Preben Neergaard as 	Journalist Pedersen
 Henry Nielsen as 	Portner
 Poul Nordstrøm as 	Observatør
 Ib Schønberg as 	Eriksson
 Ove Sprogøe as 	Togpassager
 Osvald Vallini as 	Tjener
 Lily Weiding as 	Astrid
 Mogens Wieth as 	Løjtnant Bo Swedenhielm

References

Bibliography 
 Goble, Alan. The Complete Index to Literary Sources in Film. Walter de Gruyter, 1999.

External links 
 

1947 films
Danish comedy films
1947 comedy films
1940s Danish-language films
Films directed by Lau Lauritzen Jr.
Films scored by Sven Gyldmark
Remakes of Swedish films
Danish films based on plays